Giannis Iliopoulos (born 1979) is a Greek basketball player who played for AEK Athens BC.

References

1979 births
Living people
AEK B.C. players
Place of birth missing (living people)